Kimberly Russell is an American actress best known for her role as Sarah Nevins on the 1986–1991 sitcom Head of the Class  and in the 1990 comedy film Ghost Dad alongside Bill Cosby.

Russell began acting at age 14, with a part in the movie Fame and starring in an Off-Broadway Theatre production opposite Angela Bassett called "Black Girl". She later graduated from the New York High School of Performing Arts.
Russell has appeared in numerous television shows including Family Matters, New York Undercover (which also starred Michael DeLorenzo, whom Russell co-starred with on Fame and Head of the Class), The John Larroquette Show, Ellen, ER, Strong Medicine, and The Steve Harvey Show. She also starred in films such as Hangin' with the Homeboys, The Game, Precious, "The Sins", and "The Demon House" starring Glenn Close and directed by Lee Daniels.

References

People from Brooklyn
African-American actresses
American stage actresses
American television actresses
American film actresses
Living people
21st-century African-American people
21st-century African-American women
20th-century African-American people
20th-century African-American women
Year of birth missing (living people)